The 2015–16 Coupe de France was the 99th season of the most prestigious football cup competition of France. The competition was organised by the French Football Federation (FFF) and was opened to all clubs in French football, as well as clubs from the overseas departments and territories (Guadeloupe, French Guiana, Martinique, Mayotte, New Caledonia (Hienghène Sport, winner of 2015 New Caledonia Cup), Tahiti (A.S. Pirae, winner of 2015 Tahiti Cup), Réunion, and Saint Martin).

Paris Saint-Germain were the defending champions, defeated Auxerre in the previous season's final. They defended their title after defeating Marseille 4–2 in the final.

Teams

Round 1 to 6

The first six rounds, and any preliminaries, are organised by the Regional Leagues and the Overseas Territories, who allow teams from within their league structure to enter at any point up to the Third round. Teams from CFA 2 enter at the Third round, those from CFA enter at the Fourth round and those from Championnat National enter at the Fifth round.

Teams entering in each round, by Region:

Round 7 onwards

In the Seventh round, the 156 qualifying teams from the Regional Leagues and the Overseas Territories are joined by the 20 teams from Ligue 2. The 20 Ligue 1 clubs enter in the Ninth round.

The teams qualifying for Seventh round, by region and level, are:

Ligue 2

 Alsace

 Aquitaine

Atlantique

 Auvergne

 Lower Normandy

 Bourgogne

 Centre-Val de Loire

Centre-West

 Corsica

 Franche-Comté

 Languedoc-Roussillon

 Lorraine

Maine

Méditerranée

 Midi-Pyrénées

 Nord-Pas de Calais

 Champagne-Ardenne

 Normandy

 Brittany

 Paris Île-de-France

 Picardie

 Rhône-Alpes

Overseas Clubs

Seventh Round
These matches were originally scheduled to take place on 13, 14 and 15 November, although some matches were postponed to the following weekdue to the November 2015 Paris attacks.

Eighth Round
The draw was held on 18 November 2015. The matches were played on 5 and 6 December 2015

Round of 64
Matches played on 2, 3 and 4 January 2016.

Round of 32
Matches were played between 16 and 23 January 2016.

Round of 16 
Matches played on 9, 10 and 11 February 2016.

Quarter-finals 
Matches played on 2 and 3 March 2016.

Semi-finals 
Matches played between 19 and 20 April 2016.

Final 

Match played on 21 May 2016.

References

External links

 
2015–16 European domestic association football cups
2015–16 in French football
2015-16